The canton of Hurigny is an administrative division of the Saône-et-Loire department, eastern France. It was created at the French canton reorganisation which came into effect in March 2015. Its seat is in Hurigny.

It consists of the following communes:
 
Azé
Berzé-la-Ville
Bissy-la-Mâconnaise
Burgy
Bussières
Charbonnières
Chevagny-les-Chevrières
Clessé
Cruzille
Fleurville
Hurigny
Igé
Laizé
Lugny
Milly-Lamartine
Montbellet
Péronne
Prissé
La Roche-Vineuse
Saint-Albain
Saint-Gengoux-de-Scissé
Saint-Martin-Belle-Roche
Saint-Maurice-de-Satonnay
La Salle
Senozan
Sologny
Verzé
Viré

References

Cantons of Saône-et-Loire